Pavel Leo Edmund Schmidt (9 February 1930 – 14 August 2001) was a Slovak rower who competed for Czechoslovakia, mostly in the double sculls together with Václav Kozák. They won a gold medal at the 1960 Olympics and two medals at European championships in 1959 and 1961, and placed fourth at the 1962 World Rowing Championships.

After retiring from competitions, Schmidt became a rowing coach, and in 1967–68 trained the Mexico national team. After that he did not return to Czechoslovakia, but settled in Switzerland together with his family. There he worked as a psychiatrists and as a coach at the Biel sports school.

References

External links 

 
 
 
 
 

1937 births
2001 deaths
Sportspeople from Bratislava
Slovak male rowers
Czechoslovak male rowers
Olympic rowers of Czechoslovakia
Rowers at the 1960 Summer Olympics
Olympic gold medalists for Czechoslovakia
Olympic medalists in rowing
Medalists at the 1960 Summer Olympics
European Rowing Championships medalists